Ralf Metzler (born 13 October 1968) is a physicist that focuses on nonequilibrium statistical physics and anomalous stochastic processes, with applications to biological and soft matter systems.  He currently is chair professor for theoretical physics at the University of Potsdam and is an Alexander von Humboldt Polish Honorary Research Fellow.

Education 
Metzler holds a Diploma (magna cum laude) degree in physics (1994) and a PhD (summa cum laude, 1996) from the University of Ulm. He performed postdoctoral research at Tel Aviv University with Joseph Klafter and Massachusetts Institute of Technology with Mehran Kardar.

Academic career 
Metzler became an assistant professor at the Nordic Institute for Theoretical Physics (NORDITA) in Copenhagen in 2002. He later spend a period of time in Canada, where he was appointed Canada Research Chair in Biological Physics at the University of Ottawa and he moved to the Technical University of Munich as a professor. Since 2011, he is chair professor for theoretical physics at the University of Potsdam and is an Alexander von Humboldt Polish Honorary Research Fellow.

Awards 

 Feodor Lynen Fellow, Alexander von Humboldt Foundation
 Amos de Shalit Fellow, Minerva Foundation
 Emmy Noether Fellow, Deutsche Forschungsgemeinschaft
 Canada Research Chair in Biological Physics
 Finland Distinguished Professor (FiDiPro) 
 Outstanding Referee by the American Physical Society
 Sigma Phi Prize

References

External links 

 

1968 births
Living people
People from Neuenbürg
21st-century German physicists
Academic staff of the University of Potsdam